Anne Byrne Kronenfeld is an American actress. She had a small role as the wife of Woody Allen's philandering best friend in Manhattan (1979), and also appeared in Why Would I Lie? (1980) and A Night Full of Rain (1978).

She was the first wife of actor Dustin Hoffman, having one child, Jenna Byrne, by him. Hoffman adopted Byrne's daughter from a previous marriage, Karina Hoffman-Birkhead. Byrne and Hoffman divorced in 1980 and both remarried that same year, Byrne to Ivan Kronenfeld. 

Byrne and Hoffman lived on West 11th Street in Greenwich Village, Manhattan. In 1970, members of the Weather Underground, a group of left-wing militants planning a terror bombing of Columbia University and Fort Dix in New Jersey, were killed by a premature detonation of explosives they had been stockpiling in the house next door to the couple. Dustin Hoffman can be seen in footage from the scene.

She is of Irish Catholic background.

Partial filmography
Papillon (1973) - Mrs. Dega (uncredited)
A Night Full of Rain (1978) - Friend
Manhattan (1979) - Emily
Why Would I Lie? (1980) - Faith (final film role)

References

External links

Living people
20th-century American actresses
Actresses from New York (state)
American film actresses
21st-century American women
Year of birth missing (living people)